is a Japanese light novel series written by Touko Amekawa. The series originated on the Shōsetsuka ni Narō website in February 2020, before being published in print with illustrations by Wan Hachipisu by Overlap beginning in October 2020. As of November 2021, four volumes have been released. A manga adaptation with illustrations by Hinoki Kino began serialization on the Comic Gardo website in December 2020. As of June 2022, the series' individual chapters have been collected into three volumes.

Premise
Rishe Vuetzner has had her engagement to the crown prince annulled, but this the seventh time it's happened; she's stuck with in a time Loop, where no matter the job she takes or location, she always ends up dead at 20, five years after the annulment. This time she catches the eye of Prince Arnold of the neighboring Hyne Kingdom, which was the source of a world War, pestilence and even direct murder in all her previous loops.

Rishe accepts his proposal of marriage on the condition she doesn't have to perform royal duties, and gets to loaf around. However, she soon starts using all her past life skills to help out the people of the Hyne Kingdom and sees Arnold is not the same cold person as in her 6th loop.

Media

Light novel
Written by Touko Amekawa, the series began publication on the novel posting website Shōsetsuka ni Narō on February 7, 2020. The series was later acquired by Overlap, who began publishing the series in print with illustrations by Wan Hachipisu on October 25, 2020. As of November 2021, four volumes have been released.

In October 2021, Seven Seas Entertainment announced that they licensed the series for English publication.

Volume list

Manga
A manga adaptation, illustrated by Hinoki Kino, began serialization on the Comic Gardo website on December 5, 2020. As of June 2022, the series' individual chapters have been collected into three tankōbon volumes.

In December 2021, Seven Seas Entertainment announced that they licensed the manga for English publication.

Volume list

Reception
Rebecca Silverman from Anime News Network praised the heroine, artwork, and the story, calling it unique.

Naoki Harada, an editor for Comic Gardo, picked the manga as his favorite manga from 2021.

The series has 500,000 copies in circulation between its digital and print releases.

References

External links
  
  
  
 

2020 Japanese novels
Anime and manga based on light novels
Fantasy anime and manga
Japanese webcomics
Light novels
Light novels first published online
Romance anime and manga
Seven Seas Entertainment titles
Shōnen manga
Shōsetsuka ni Narō
Webcomics in print